Mesalina kuri is a species of sand-dwelling lizard in the family Lacertidae. The species is endemic to the island of Abd al Kuri in the Socotra Archipelago of Yemen.

References

kuri
Endemic fauna of Socotra
Lacertid lizards of Africa
Reptiles described in 2002
Taxa named by Ulrich Joger
Taxa named by Werner Mayer (herpetologist)